Grace Musgrove (born 18 June 1992) is an Australian triathlete.

She has competed at various levels including domestic championships such as the Oceania Cross Country Championships and in international events such as the Grand Prix de Triathlon. She has also represented Australia in various international open events.

Personal life
She was born on 18 June 1992, in Bowral, New South Wales, Australia. Her hometown is Moss Vale but she currently resides in Wollongong. In her senior year in high school she won the National Cross Country title.

Achievements 
 2015 - Davenport Oceania Championship, 5th place.
 2015 - Under 23 Australian Championships, 2nd place.
 2013 - Geelong Oceania Cup, 2nd place - Australian Sprint Distance title
 2013 - Wellington Oceania Championships, 3rd place
 2013 - Mooloolaba Oceania Cup, 1st place
 2012 - Tongyeong World Cup, 13th place
 2012 - A number of top 10 placings in European Cups
 2012 – Mooloolaba Oceania Cup, 8th place
 2012 – Subic Bay Asian Cup, 2nd place

Her coach is Jamie Turner.

References

External links
Profile at Triathlon Australia

Australian female triathletes
Living people
1992 births
People from Bowral
Sportswomen from New South Wales
20th-century Australian women
21st-century Australian women